Johnathan Wendel (born February 26, 1981), more commonly known by his online alias Fatal1ty (pronounced "Fatality"), is an entrepreneur and former professional esports player of the first-person shooter titles Quake and Painkiller. He was an early pioneer of competitive gaming and was once considered one of the best professional gamers in the world. He founded Fatal1ty Inc., which licenses the Fatal1ty brand to gaming accessory manufacturers.

Playing career
Fatal1ty turned professional in 1999 at age 18 playing Quake III Arena.

Wendel has won about 450,000 in cash and prizes from professional competitions, mainly in the Cyberathlete Professional League (CPL). In addition to receiving numerous product partnerships with his company Fatal1ty Brand (Fatal1ty, Inc.), he has been featured in mainstream newsprint publications such as Time, The New York Times, Forbes, and the BBC World Service. He has also been featured on 60 Minutes. He has a training regimen where he practices at least eight hours each day, sometimes more.

Wendel has been a successful competitor in many first-person shooter games. He debuted as a professional gamer in October 1999 by placing 3rd in the Quake III Arena tournament at the CPL's FRAG 3 event. He has competed in tournaments with Counter-Strike, Call of Duty and Quake III Arena which he won with his team clan Kapitol at the first-ever CPL Teamplay World Championships (FRAG 4).  Most of his successes have been with one-versus-one deathmatch games including Quake III Arena, Unreal Tournament 2003, and Painkiller. During his career, he has won a total of twelve world championship titles, including four player of the year awards with the Cyberathlete Professional League and one with the World Cyber Games.

On March 13, 2003, Wendel was profiled on an episode of MTV's True Life reality television series. The episode documented his life and how he prepared for the Cyberathlete Professional League's Winter 2002 Unreal Tournament 2003. Among those featured alongside Wendel in the professional gaming industry were his friends Phil "shogun" Kennedy, and Brian "astro" Lewis, who were also very well known in the professional gaming circuit.

Wendel was the spokesman of the now defunct Championship Gaming Series and had put aside actively competing in 2007. Wendel retired from competition in 2008.

Wendel held the record for most prize money won in all of esports until he was overtaken by Korean StarCraft player Lee Jaedong near the end of 2013.

World championships
 CPL: 4 (2000, 2001, 2002, 2005)
 WCG: 1 (2000)

Post-retirement
Wendel started a business, Fatal1ty, Inc., that sells his brand of gaming mousepads, "FATpads". He later expanded this into other gaming products through a business partnership with OCZ Technology, Creative Labs, ASRock, Universal Abit, GamerFood and Southern Enterprises, Inc. to create motherboards, energy snacks,  sound cards, gaming desks, computer mice, headphones, and power supplies under the Fatal1ty name.

In honor of his contributions to video gaming, Wendel was awarded the first ever Lifetime Achievement Award by eSports. He was inducted into the International Video Game Hall of Fame in August 2010 and holds a spot in the Guinness Book of World Records.

In July 2012, Topps released their 2012 Topps Allen & Ginter Baseball set, which includes autographs and worn shirt memorabilia cards of Wendel.

Personal life
Wendel was born on February 26, 1981, to James and Judy Wendel and grew up in Kansas City, Missouri. Fatal1ty played on his high school tennis team. His parents divorced when he was 13.

He moved to Las Vegas, Nevada in 2006 and lived on the Las Vegas Strip as of 2014.

References

External links

1981 births
Living people
American esports players
21st-century American businesspeople
People from Independence, Missouri
People from Kansas City, Missouri
People from Overland Park, Kansas
Quake (series) players
Painkiller players
People from Las Vegas
Team Razer players